Tshepo Moreki (born 7 October 1993) is a South African cricketer. He was included in the Boland cricket team for the 2015 Africa T20 Cup.

In August 2017, he was named in Benoni Zalmi's squad for the first season of the T20 Global League. However, in October 2017, Cricket South Africa initially postponed the tournament until November 2018, with it being cancelled soon after.

In June 2018, he was named in the squad for the Titans team for the 2018–19 season. In September 2018, he was named in the Titans' squad for the 2018 Abu Dhabi T20 Trophy. In October 2018, he was named in Paarl Rocks' squad for the first edition of the Mzansi Super League T20 tournament. In October 2019, in the opening round of fixtures of the 2019–20 CSA 4-Day Franchise Series, Moreki took a hat-trick for Titans against Dolphins.

In April 2021, he was named in Western Province's squad, ahead of the 2021–22 cricket season in South Africa.

References

External links
 

1993 births
Living people
South African cricketers
Boland cricketers
Titans cricketers
Paarl Rocks cricketers
Cricketers from Durban